The Art of Murder is a 1999 American-Canadian thriller television film that first aired on the network television on December 14, 1999. It stars Michael Moriarty, Joanna Pacula, Boyd Kestner and Peter Onorati.

Plot
Elizabeth Sheridan (Joanna Pacula), a painter, is married to Cole (Michael Moriarty), who runs a yacht-building company. When Cole becomes abusive, Elizabeth begins an affair with Tony Blanchard (Boyd Kestner), the firm's top designer. When a blackmailer (Peter Onorati) produces incriminating pictures of her and Tony, she and Tony agree to pay, but when murder gets added to the mix, she becomes the obvious suspect.

Cast
Michael Moriarty as Cole Sheridan
Joanna Pacula as Elizabeth Sheridan
Boyd Kestner as Tony Blanchard
Peter Onorati as Willie Kassel
Nathaniel Deveaux as Sheriff Powers Crawford
Kathryn Anderson as Tina
Betty Linde as Ora Mae Howell
Mark Brandon as Ken Lothrop
Thomas Miller as Tommy Lothrop
Jaclynn Grad as Casey McHugh
John Nelson as Trooper
John Tierney as Burton Hiasen
Kim Stern as Waitress

Reception
In a review for Radio Times, David Parkinson said in regards of Joanna Pacula's appearance in the film, "Ever since she hit Hollywood in 1983's Gorky Park, Polish-born Joanna Pacula has been slowly sliding down the rankings. This is a pity, as she's an incredibly physical actress in every sense of the word. She certainly deserves better than this tepid thriller." Parkinson summarized the film's plot as "There's a couple of twists that just about pass muster. But whether you'll consider them worth waiting for, after an interminably slow opening, is debatable."

References

External links

1999 television films
1999 films
1999 thriller films
Adultery in films
American thriller television films
1990s English-language films
Canadian thriller television films
English-language Canadian films
Films about domestic violence
1990s American films
1990s Canadian films